Travancore State Congress also known as the State Congress is a political party which was formed in 1938 to demand responsible governance in the princely state of Travancore.

Background
Following the formation of People's Ministries (responsible governments) at the provincial level in British India under the Government of India Act of 1935, the demand for responsible governance on the basis of adult suffrage in the princely states was strengthened.

In February 1938, the Haripura Conference of the AICC decided that the Indian National Congress Committees in the princely states should not be actively involved in the political movements in the princely states and that independent political organizations should be encouraged to carry on the political agitations.

In the wake of the Haripura AICC decision, in February 1938, A. Narayana Pillai's lawyer's office in Thiruvananthapuram.The political leadership meeting chaired by C. V. Kunhiraman  along with another prominent freedom fighter and journalist Balaramapuram G Raman Pillai decided to form an independent political party called the Travancore State Congress.  Pattom A. Thanu Pillai has been appointed as its president. Kunhiraman was the General secretary and Raman Pillai was the treasurer An interim committee was formed with P. S. Nataraja Pillai as the secretary.  The State Congress came into being with the decision to launch an agitation for responsible governance in Travancore.

Movement for responsible governance
The move to launch an agitation for responsible governance was countered by the Diwan Sir CP in a highly undemocratic manner.  Ramaswamy Iyer outlawed the State Congress and the Youth League.

But with this, the State Congress changed its way of working. As part of the strategy, the working committee was dissolved and they decided to give the president all the power and start an illegal strike.  Congress President Pattom Thanu Pillai was arrested on August 26, 1938. Subsequent dictatorial 10 presidents (including Accamma Cherian) were subsequently arrested.  Hundreds of activists were arrested for violating the law.  Lathicharges and shootings took place in many places.

Finally, on September 4, 1947, the king was compelled to issue an edict imposing a responsible rule on Sri Chithira Thirunal.  The House of Representatives was formed in February 1948 on the basis of adult suffrage to form the State Constitution. The State Congress won a majority in the elections on March 24, 1948.  Thanu Pillai is the Prime Minister and C. Kesavan, T. M. Varghese and others formed a cabinet with ministers and took charge.

When Travancore and Kochi merged to form Travancore on July 1, 1949, the Travancore State Congress became the Thiru–Kochi State Congress.  This party is divided and a faction is formed.  The other faction in the Praja Socialist Party, led by Thanu Pillai. And A. J. John, C. Kesavan, T. M. Varghese their fraction joined the Indian National Congress and disappeared.

References

Defunct political parties in India
Indian National Congress
Political parties established in 1938
1938 establishments in India